Phytoecia eugeniae is a species of beetle in the family Cerambycidae. It was described by Ganglbauer in 1884. It is known from Iran.

It was placed in the genus Pygoptosia  in the Catalogue of Palaearctic Coleoptera.

References

Phytoecia
Beetles described in 1884